World Economy and International Relations is the flagship journal of the IMEMO Institute in Moscow published from 1957.

References

External links
 

economics journals
international relations journals
mass media in Moscow
publications established in 1957
Russian Academy of Sciences academic journals
Russian-language journals